Popigay is a rural locality (a settlement) in Taymyrsky Dolgano-Nenetsky District of Krasnoyarsk Krai, Russia. It is known for the Popigay River and Popigay crater.

Rural localities in Krasnoyarsk Krai
Taymyrsky Dolgano-Nenetsky District